The vice president of Cuba, previously the vice president of the Council of State between 1976 and 2019, is the second highest political position obtainable in the Council of State of Cuba. Currently there is a provision for several vice presidents, who are elected in the same manner as the president of Cuba.

Historically, the vice president of Cuba was elected in the same ticket with the president. The position has been in use 1902–1928, 1936, 1940–1958, and since 1976.

Vice presidents of the Republic in Arms (1869–1899)

Vice presidents of the Republic (1902–1959)

First vice presidents of the Council of State (1976–2019)

Vice-presidents elected by the National Assembly on 19 April 2018:
First Vice-President: Salvador Valdés Mesa
Vice-President: Ramiro Valdes Menendez
Vice-President: Roberto Tomas Morales Ojeda
Vice-President: Gladys Maria Bejerano Portela

Vice President of the Republic of Cuba (2019–present)

See also
Elections in Cuba
President of Cuba
List of current vice presidents

References

 
Political office-holders in Cuba
Cuba
1902 establishments in Cuba